Frederick Allen Aldrich AB, M.Sc., Ph.D. (May 1, 1927 – July 12, 1991) was an American marine biologist and educator. He is best remembered for his research on giant squid.

Biography 
Aldrich was born in Butler, New Jersey, and attended Rutgers University, where he earned his doctorate. He began working at Memorial University of Newfoundland in 1961 as an associate professor of biology. He became head of the department two years later. He became the first director of the Marine Sciences Research Laboratory at Logy Bay in 1967. 

In 1990, Aldrich became the Moses Harvey Professor of Marine Biology, a named chair that he would hold until his death.

Recognition 
The squid species Australiteuthis aldrichi is named after him.

References

American marine biologists
American malacologists
Teuthologists
1927 births
1991 deaths
People from Butler, New Jersey
Rutgers University alumni
Academic staff of the Memorial University of Newfoundland
20th-century American zoologists